Spilosoma buryi is a moth in the family Erebidae. It was described by Walter Rothschild in 1910. It is found in Ghana and Nigeria.

Description
In 1920 George F. Hampson wrote:

References

Diacrisia buryi at BHL

Moths described in 1910
buryi